A spearman is a fighter armed with a spear.

People
 Spearman (surname)
 Spearman baronets, a title in the Baronetage of the United Kingdom

Places
 Spearman, Texas
Spearman High School
 Spearman Independent School District

Other
The Spearman, an alternate title for the Shaw Brothers film Flag of Iron
 Spearman–Brown prediction formula, a formula relating psychometric reliability
 Spearman's rank correlation coefficient, a non-parametric test statistic

See also
 James Spearman Winter (1845–1911), former Premier of Newfoundland
 Charles Spearman Armstrong (1847–1924), tea and cinchona planter in British Ceylon
 Spear (disambiguation)
 Man (disambiguation)